Morris Goldenberg (July 28, 1911 – 1969) was an American percussionist, music teacher, and method book author. He wrote several books on orchestral snare drumming, mallet percussion, and timpani. He is a member of the Percussive Arts Society Hall of Fame.

Career
Morris Goldenberg was born July 28, 1911, in Holyoke, MA. He studied music at the Juilliard School in New York, then called the Institute of Musical Arts, graduating in 1932.

His career as a percussionist began with the Chautauqua Symphony from 1934 to 1937. He also played with the Russian Opera Company in 1936 and the Russian Ballet in 1937. Goldenberg became a member of the Metropolitan Opera's WOR Orchestra in 1938 and played in that ensemble until 1952.

Goldenberg was a faculty member at the Juilliard School from 1941 to 1969. He also taught at the Manhattan School of Music from 1959 to 1969. During his time as a teacher he wrote and published several instructional books. The first, in 1950, was Modern School for Xylophone, Marimba, Vibraphone, which is often just referred to as "The Goldenberg Book." In 1955, he produced a companion volume Modern School for Snare Drum with a Guide Book for the Artist Percussionist. He later wrote several books for timpani including: Standard Concertos for Timpani: From the Piano and Violin Solo Repertory, Classic Symphonies for Timpani, Classic Overtures for Timpani, and  Romantic Symphonies for Timpani. He also wrote several solo works for snare drum between 1964 and 1966 that would later be compiled into the book 12 Progressive Solos for Snare Drum. in 1967 he published his Concerto in A Minor for Marimba and Xylophone. He also wrote other works for solo snare drum and multiple percussion setups.

Goldenberg performed for television (including NBC), film, radio, and in the recording studio in addition to his live orchestral performances. He died in 1969 and was inducted into the Percussive Arts Society Hall of Fame in 1974.

Goldenberg's students include former Chicago Symphony principal timpanist Gordon B. Peters, New York Philharmonic percussionist Morris "Arnie" Lang, drummer Allan Schwartzberg, jazz drummer Marty Morrell, drummer and author Lew Malin, jazz drummer and teacher Joseph D. Sefcik, fusion drummer Billy Cobham, prominent drum book author Garwood Whaley, Warren Benbow,   studio-orchestral-world percussionist and Juilliard School faculty 1991–2014, Gordon Gottlieb, and Philadelphia Orchestra principal percussionist Michael Lloyd "Mickey" Bookspan.

Publications
 Modern School for Xylophone, Marimba, Vibraphone
 Modern School for Snare Drum with a Guide Book for the Artist Percussionist
 Standard Concertos for Timpani: From the Piano and Violin Solo Repertory
 Classic Symphonies for Timpani
 Romantic Symphonies for Timpani
 Classic Overtures for Timpani
 12 Progressive Solos for Snare Drum
 Concerto in A Minor
 A Little Suite for Snare Drum
 Lucy's Riff
 Sticks and Skins
 Studies in Solo Percussion
 Marching Drum Sticks

References 

1911 births
1969 deaths
20th-century American drummers
American male drummers
20th-century American male musicians
People from Holyoke, Massachusetts